This is a list of State Protected Monuments as officially reported by and available through the website of the Archaeological Survey of India in the Indian state Odisha. The monument identifier is a combination of the abbreviation of the subdivision of the list (state, ASI circle) and the numbering as published on the website of the ASI. 218 State Protected Monuments have been recognized by the ASI in Odisha. Besides the State Protected Monuments, also the Monuments of National Importance in this state might be relevant.

List of state protected monuments 

|}

See also 
 List of State Protected Monuments in India for other State Protected Monuments in India
 List of Monuments of National Importance in Odisha

References 

Odisha
Monuments